Michael S. Schudson (born November 3, 1946) is professor of journalism in the graduate school of journalism of Columbia University and adjunct professor in the department of sociology. He is professor emeritus at the University of California, San Diego. He is an expert in the fields such as journalism history, media sociology, political communication, and public culture.

Biography
Schudson grew up in Milwaukee, Wisconsin. He received his BA from Swarthmore College (1969) and his MA (1970) and PhD (1976) from Harvard University in sociology. He taught at the University of Chicago from 1976 to 1980 and the University of California, San Diego, from 1980 to 2009. From 2006 to 2009, he was on the faculty of both University of California, San Diego, and Columbia. He has been working full-time at Columbia since 2009.

Schudson has received major awards such as a Guggenheim Fellowship, a residential fellowship at the Center for Advanced Study in the Behavioral Sciences at Stanford University, and a MacArthur "genius" fellowship. On being named a MacArthur fellow in 1990, the foundation identified him as "an interpreter of public culture and of collective or civic memory". He was awarded an honorary doctorate from the University of Groningen in 2014.

Schudson lives in New York City and is married to communication scholar Julia Sonnevend.

Work
Schudson is the author of seven books and editor of three others concerning the history and sociology of American journalism, the history of United States citizenship and political participation, advertising, popular culture, book publishing, and cultural memory. His books, Discovering the News (Basic Books, 1978), Advertising, the Uneasy Persuasion (Basic Books, 1984), The Good Citizen: A History of American Civic Life (Free Press, 1998), The Sociology of News (W. W. Norton, 2003, 2011), and Why Democracies Need an Unlovable Press (Polity Press, 2008); all have been published in Chinese translation. His other works include Watergate in American Memory (Basic Books, 1992); The Power of News (Harvard University Press, 1995), Reading the News (Pantheon, 1986), co-edited with Robert K. Manoff; Rethinking Popular Culture (University of California Press, 1991), co-edited with Chandra Mukerji; and The Enduring Book (vol. 5 of The History of the Book in America, University of North Carolina Press, 2009), co-edited with David Paul Nord and Joan Shelley Rubin.

His books are reviewed in both specialized and general publications. The Journal of American History judged The Good Citizen (1998) to be "relevant, imaginative, and determined to face facts" and The Economist urged all Americans to read it. Times Higher Education (UK) called Why Democracies Need an Unlovable Press (2008) "eloquent and wise".

Schudson publishes in both academic and general-interest journals. In the Winter 2019 edition of the Columbia Journalism Review he authored a history of "trust" issues related to journalistic reporting in the United States, a historical review of such issues, and the origin of the term, "the media", that is entitled, The Fall, Rise, and Fall of Media Trust. He offered an assessment of whether and how trust may be cultivated by journalists and publishers. Its subtitle is, "There are worse things than being widely disliked".

He is co-author, with Leonard Downie Jr., of a report on the future of news, The Reconstruction of American Journalism (2009), that was sponsored by the Columbia Journalism School.

Books
Discovering the News: A Social History of American Newspapers (1978) 
Advertising, the Uneasy Persuasion (1984) 
Reading the News (1986) editor with Robert K. Manoff 
Rethinking Popular Culture: Contemporary Perspectives in Cultural Studies (1991) editor with Chandra Mukerji 
Watergate in American Memory: How We Remember, Forget and Reconstruct the Past (1992) 
The Power of News (1995) 
The Good Citizen: A History of American Civic Life (1998) 
The Sociology of News (2003, 2011) 
Why Democracies Need an Unlovable Press (2008) 
The Enduring Book (vol. 5 of The History of the Book in America) (2009) editor with David Paul Nord and Joan Shelley Rubin

References

External links
Faculty profile at Columbia University
Faculty profile page at UCSD
Why "The Informed Citizen" Is Too Much to Ask - And Not Enough (1999 Batten Symposium Keynote Address)
On Advertising -- an extract

1946 births
Swarthmore College alumni
Harvard Graduate School of Arts and Sciences alumni
American sociologists
MacArthur Fellows
Living people
University of Chicago faculty
University of California, San Diego faculty
Columbia University faculty
Fellows of the American Academy of Arts and Sciences